Dan Comiskey (born June 30, 1972 in Windsor, Ontario) is a retired Canadian football offensive lineman, turned professional speaker, who played 13 seasons for the Saskatchewan Roughriders, Hamilton Tiger-Cats, Edmonton Eskimos and Calgary Stampeders of the Canadian Football League. He was drafted in the fifth round of the 1997 CFL Draft by the Roughriders. He played CIS football for the Windsor Lancers.

On Tuesday, May 18, 2010 it was announced that Comiskey had signed a contract with the Calgary Stampeders.

References 

1972 births
Living people
Calgary Stampeders players
Canadian football offensive linemen
Edmonton Elks players
Hamilton Tiger-Cats players
Players of Canadian football from Ontario
Saskatchewan Roughriders players
Sportspeople from Windsor, Ontario
Windsor Lancers football players